The 2007 Chinese Professional Baseball League (CPBL) regular season was split into 2 half seasons, 1st half and 2nd half. The former was holding from March 17 to June 17, and the later was holding between June 29 to September 30.

First Half Results

Second Half Results

Chinese Professional Baseball League lists
2007
2007 in Taiwanese sport
2007 in baseball